Walter Ives  (26 August 191720 December 2006) was a senior Australian public servant. He was head of the Department of Primary Industry from 1968 to 1978.

Life and career
Walter Ives was born on 26 August 1917.

Ives worked in the CSIRO, and was appointed to the Department of Primary Industry in 1969 from his position there. As the Department of Primary Industry transitioned to become the Department of Agriculture, and then the Department of Primary Industry again, Ives remained its head.

In May 1978, Ives was named as the first chairman of the Primary Industry Bank of Australia, and he left the Department of Primary Industry.

Ives died on 20 December 2006, aged 89.

Awards
Ives was appointed a Commander of the Order of the British Empire in June 1976 for his public service.

References

1917 births
2006 deaths
Australian public servants
Australian Commanders of the Order of the British Empire
CSIRO people
Burials in New South Wales